Saint-Roch-des-Aulnaies is a municipality in Quebec, Canada.

See also
 List of municipalities in Quebec
 Alexis Bélanger

References

External links 
 

Municipalities in Quebec
Incorporated places in Chaudière-Appalaches
Canada geography articles needing translation from French Wikipedia